Sir Robert Wilson Porter, PC (NI), QC (23 December 1923 – 25 May 2014) was a Northern Irish politician, barrister and judge. He served as a pilot in the Royal Air Force during World War II and was later an officer in the Territorial Army.

Early life
Porter was born on 23 December 1923 in Derry, Northern Ireland, to Joseph Wilson Porter, and his wife Letitia Porter. Always known by his nickname Beezer, Porter was educated at Foyle College, a state grammar school in Derry. He studied law at Queen's University Belfast which was interrupted by his military service during World War II. He returned to his studies in 1946 and graduated in 1949 Bachelor of Laws (LLB).

Career

Military service
In 1943, he joined the Royal Air Force Volunteer Reserve, and serving until 1946. He was posted to South Africa where he trained and qualified as a pilot. He reached the rank of flight sergeant while serving with the other ranks. On 11 February 1945, he was commissioned into the Royal Air Force Volunteer Reserve as a pilot officer on probation. On 11 August 1945, he was promoted to flying officer (war substantive).

From 1950 to 1956, he served with the British Army. On 20 November 1950, he joined the Royal Regiment of Artillery, Territorial Army as a second lieutenant with seniority from 18 March 1947. He was later promoted to lieutenant, back dated to 20 November 1950. On 21 March 1952, he was promoted to captain. On 16 October 1956, he transferred to the Territorial Army reserve of Officers, thereby ending his military service.

Legal career
Porter was called to the Bar of Northern Ireland in 1950. During his early years as a practising barrister, he was also a part-time lecturer in law at Queen's University Belfast. He was appointed Queen's Counsel in 1965. From 1978 until 1995 Porter was a judge of the county courts.

Political career
He was active in the Ulster Unionist Party (UUP) before his election. In 1966 he was elected to the Parliament of Northern Ireland representing Queen's University. In January 1969 he served as Parliamentary Secretary to the Ministry of Home Affairs, after which he was appointed Minister of Health and Social Services. In March he became the Minister of Home Affairs and was also appointed to the Privy Council of Northern Ireland.

Within the Cabinet he was regarded as a moderate and declared that a broadening of the local government franchise called for primarily by nationalists was inevitable.

Porter's seat was abolished for the 1969 Northern Ireland general election, but he was able to win the new Lagan Valley seat.  He resigned as Minister of Home Affairs in August 1970. He claimed to have resigned due to ill health, but he later complained that he had not been consulted about the imposition of a military curfew on the Falls Road in July. He resigned from the UUP itself in June 1972 to join the Alliance Party of Northern Ireland.

Later life
He died at the age of 90 on 25 May 2014 in Belfast. His funeral was held on 29 May at Holy Trinity Church in Ballylesson, Belfast.

Personal life
Portor was a member of the Orange Order but resigned in 1971 because of his lodge's support of provocative Loyalist rallies.

References

|-

1923 births
2014 deaths
People educated at Foyle College
Alumni of Queen's University Belfast
Alliance Party of Northern Ireland members of the House of Commons of Northern Ireland
Royal Air Force pilots of World War II
Members of the House of Commons of Northern Ireland 1965–1969
Members of the House of Commons of Northern Ireland 1969–1973
Members of the Privy Council of Northern Ireland
Northern Ireland Cabinet ministers (Parliament of Northern Ireland)
20th-century King's Counsel
Knights Bachelor
Ulster Unionist Party members of the House of Commons of Northern Ireland
Royal Artillery officers
Recorders of Belfast
Northern Ireland King's Counsel
Members of the House of Commons of Northern Ireland for County Down constituencies
Members of the House of Commons of Northern Ireland for Queen's University of Belfast
Royal Air Force Volunteer Reserve personnel of World War II